"Loud and clear" are a common pair of prowords used in plain language radio checks.

Loud and Clear may also refer to:
Loud & Clear, the UK title of the 1978 Sammy Hagar album All Night Long
Loud and Clear (Buster Brown album), 1985
Loud and Clear (Autograph album), 1987
"Loud and Clear", a song by The Cranberries from their album Bury the Hatchet, 1999
Loud and Clear (The O.C. Supertones album), 2000
"Loud and Clear", a song by The Sleeping from their album Questions & Answers, 2006
Loud and Clear, a 2004 book by Anna Quindlen
"Loud & Clear", a song by Olly Murs from his album Right Place Right Time, 2012